Cretan cuisine is the traditional cuisine of the Mediterranean island of Crete.

Background
The core of the Cretan cuisine consists of food derived from plants, whereas food of animal origin was more peripheral in nature. In general, people consumed seasonal products, available in the wider local area, which underwent minimal processing or none at all. The traditional cuisine was widespread in the island until the 1960s when, with improving living standards, alimentary patterns changed towards more meat and other animal-derived produce.

Fresh fruit and dried fruits, pulses, endemic wild herbs and aromatic plants, and rough cereals, whose cultivation was favored by the regional climate, were consumed in great amounts and constituted the base of the Cretan cuisine during that period. Dairy products were consumed on a daily basis in low to moderate quantities. Poultry and fish were consumed on a weekly basis in moderate quantities, whereas red meat was consumed only a few times a month. The main supply of fat was effectuated by olive oil, which was used not only in salads but also in cooking, unlike the northern European countries which primarily used animal fat.  Another essential feature of the Cretan cuisine was the moderate use of alcohol, mainly red wine which accompanied meals. Finally, the most common dessert was yogurt and fresh fruits, while traditional pastry based on honey had been consumed a few times a week.

Appetizers
Dakos (salad)
Stamnagathi (cichorium) salad
Piktí (or Tsiladiá), pork charcuterie
Apáki, smoked pork (or chicken) meat
Paximadi
Kalitsounia 
Kolokythoanthoi
Kolokythopita
Marathopita
Mizithropita, mizithra sandwich
Sykoti Savore, liver cooked in vinegar
Staka, buttercream roux
Graviera cheese
Xynomizithra cheese
Xygalo cheese
Pichtogalo cheese
Other cheeses include Amarino, Seliano, Tirozouli, Tiromalama

Specialities
Antikristo (or Oftó), lamb meat
Blessed thistle with lamb
Hirino me selino, pork meat with celery
Gamopilafo, rice cooked in goat and rooster broth
Snails with tomato
Sfougato (omelette with potatoes/pumpkin)
Sofegada, vegetables
Triftoudia, type of orzo
Types of pasta, such as Skioufichta, Magiri, Chilofta, Avgochilos
Xerotigana, dessert
Amygdalopita (dessert)
Patouda (dessert)
Portokalopita (dessert)

Drinks
Tsikoudia
Rakomelo
Cretan wine

Gallery

See also
 Greek restaurant

External links
 Cretan Quality Agreement

 
Greek cuisine
Culture of Crete